Wynnella is a genus of ascomycete fungi of the family Helvellaceae. It contains two species, the type, W. auricula, and W. silvicola. The genus was circumscribed by French mycologist Jean Louis Émile Boudier in 1885. Wynnella is a sister genus to Helvella.

References

External links

Ascomycota genera
Pezizales